Dr. Ivan Joseph Martin Osiier (December 16, 1888 – December 23, 1965), was a Danish Olympic medalist, and world champion, fencer who fenced foil, épée, and saber. He was given the Olympic Diploma of Merit during his career. He is also one of only five athletes who have competed in the Olympics over a span of 40 years.

Personal life
Osiier was born in Copenhagen, Denmark, and was Jewish. His parents were Martin Moses Meyer Osiier (1861–1933) and Hanne Henriette Ruben (1865–1922). He was married to Ellen Osiier, who became the first female Olympic fencing champion by winning the women's foil at the 1924 Summer Olympics.

He attended the secondary school Borgerdydskolen (The School of Civic Virtue) in Copenhagen, and later studied medicine. He was a surgeon at Garrison Hospital in Copenhagen in 1915–17. He later served as a physician. He was forced to flee Denmark during the Nazi occupation of Denmark due to his being Jewish, and went to Sweden where he worked at Saint Göran Hospital.

Fencing career

Championships 
At fencing competitions in Denmark, Osiier won 25 events between 1913 and 1929. In fencing competitions for Scandinavia, Osilier won 13 events between 1921 and 1933.

Olympics 
Osiier first competed at the 1908 Summer Olympics and continued to appear in consecutive Olympics up to the 1948 Summer Olympics. During the 1912 Summer Olympics, Osiier finished in second during the épée event. Osiier withdrew from the 1936 Summer Olympics, as did Danish Jewish wrestler (and 1932 Olympic silver medalist) Abraham Kurland.

He is one of only four athletes who have competed in the Olympics over a span of 40 years, along with sailors Magnus Konow, Paul Elvstrøm, Durward Knowles and showjumper Ian Millar. Apart from competitions, Osiier worked for the Denmark Fencing Federation as their leader. The Olympic Diploma of Merit was given to Osiier during his career.

Hall of Fame 
Osiier was inducted into the International Jewish Sports Hall of Fame in 1986.

See also 
 List of athletes with the most appearances at Olympic Games
 List of select Jewish fencers

References

External links 
 Olympic record
 International Jewish Sports Hall of Fame bio
 Jewish Sports Legends bio
 Jews in Sports bio
 IMDB bio
 Photos 

1888 births
1965 deaths
Danish male fencers
Jewish male épée fencers
Jewish male foil fencers
Jewish male sabre fencers
Jewish Danish sportspeople
Olympic fencers of Denmark
Olympic silver medalists for Denmark
Olympic medalists in fencing
Fencers at the 1908 Summer Olympics
Fencers at the 1912 Summer Olympics
Fencers at the 1920 Summer Olympics
Fencers at the 1924 Summer Olympics
Fencers at the 1928 Summer Olympics
Fencers at the 1932 Summer Olympics
Fencers at the 1948 Summer Olympics
International Jewish Sports Hall of Fame inductees
Medalists at the 1912 Summer Olympics